Keep On Pushing is a studio album by the Impressions, released on ABC-Paramount in 1964. This was the group's biggest hit album ever, reaching number 8 on the Billboard 200 chart, the band's highest position on the chart, and number 4 on the Top R&B/Hip-Hop Albums chart. The title track, "Keep On Pushing," reached number 10 on the Billboard Hot 100 chart and number 1 on the Hot R&B/Hip-Hop Songs chart.

Production
"Amen" was an African-American spiritual arranged and sung by Jester Hairston for the 1963 film Lilies of the Field, starring Sidney Poitier. Curtis Mayfield had been inspired by the film and the song "Amen" in particular: "Of course, I'd decided to do a version of it.  We put it together in the studio starting off with a musical 'swing low sweet chariot', and then we fell into that particular song with somewhat of a marching rhythm."

The album cover has a photograph taken by Don Bronstein of the group pushing Mayfield's Jaguar E-Type.

Critical reception

John Bush of AllMusic gave the album 4 stars out of 5, describing it as "an excellent introduction for pop audiences just waking up to the inspirational power of soul music's finest group." He said, "the album featured all the hallmarks of an Impressions set: impeccably smooth harmonies, the dynamic horn charts of Johnny Pate, and many more of Mayfield's irresistible songs (each with a clever spin on the usual love lyric as well as a strong sense of melody)."

Keep On Pushing was one of those displayed on the cover of Bob Dylan's 1965 album, Bringing It All Back Home. Bob Marley included "Amen" and "I Made a Mistake" as part of the regular set list of the Wailers.

In 2017, Pitchfork placed it at number 167 on the "200 Best Albums of the 1960s" list. Evan Minsker said, "Every song is crafted just as beautifully as the title track, with Pate's expert arrangements backing the trio's earworm harmonies."

Track listing

Personnel
Credits adapted from liner notes.
The Impressions
 Curtis Mayfield – lead vocals, guitar, production
 Fred Cash – backing vocals
 Sam Gooden – backing vocals
 The Funk Brothers – instrumentation
Technical
 Johnny Pate – arrangements
 Don Bronstein – cover photography
 Bob Ghiraldini – liner photography
 Joe Lebow – liner design

Charts

References

External links
 

1964 albums
The Impressions albums
ABC Records albums
Albums produced by Curtis Mayfield
Albums arranged by Johnny Pate